X-Rated Fairy Tales/Superior Catholic Finger is an anthology by Helios Creed, released on July 29, 1994, through Cleopatra Records. It collects his first two solo works, X-Rated Fairy Tales and Superior Catholic Finger, on one CD.

Track listing

References 

1994 compilation albums
Cleopatra Records compilation albums
Helios Creed albums